Jeremiah Joseph O'Keefe IV (May 21, 1946 – December 3, 2007) was an American politician and businessman.

Born in Biloxi, Mississippi, O'Keefe went to Notre Dame High School in Biloxi, Mississippi. He, then, served in the United States Marine Corps from 1964 to 1967. He graduated from University of Southern Mississippi in 1970 and then went to Tulane University Law School. He was involved with the gas and oil drilling rights business in Louisiana and also was the captain of his shrimp boat. He owned a restaurant in Florida and helped write the O'Keefe family cookbook: "Cooking on the Gulf." From 1971 to 1979, O'Keefe served in the Mississippi House of Representatives. His father Jeremiah Joseph O'Keefe also served in the Mississippi Legislature. He died, at his home, in Ocean Springs, Mississippi.

Notes

External links
 Mayor Jeremiah Joseph O'Keefe (His son Jeremiah Joseph O'Keefe IV is also mention in the article about his father)

1946 births
2007 deaths
Politicians from Biloxi, Mississippi
People from Ocean Springs, Mississippi
University of Southern Mississippi alumni
Tulane University Law School alumni
Businesspeople from Mississippi
Writers from Mississippi
Members of the Mississippi House of Representatives
Military personnel from Mississippi
20th-century American politicians
20th-century American businesspeople